
Gmina Klucze is a rural gmina (administrative district) in Olkusz County, Lesser Poland Voivodeship, in southern Poland.

Villages
Gmina Klucze contains the villages and settlements of Bogucin Duży, Bydlin, Chechło, Cieślin, Golczowice, Hucisko Kwaśniowskie, Jaroszowiec, Klucze, Kolbark, Krzywopłoty, Kwaśniów Dolny, Kwaśniów Górny, Rodaki, Ryczówek and Zalesie Golczowskie.

Neighbouring gminas
Gmina Klucze is bordered by the gminas of Bolesław, Łazy, Ogrodzieniec, Olkusz, Pilica and Wolbrom.

References
Polish official population figures 2006

Klucze
Olkusz County